Tłumaczów  is a village in the administrative district of Gmina Radków, within Kłodzko County, Lower Silesian Voivodeship, in south-western Poland, near the border with the Czech Republic.

Notable people
Paul Bartsch (1871–1960), German-American malacologist

References

Villages in Kłodzko County